Diekirch railway station is a railway station serving Diekirch, in north-eastern Luxembourg. It is operated by Chemins de Fer Luxembourgeois, the state-owned railway company.

The station is situated on a branch of the Line 10, which connects Luxembourg City to the centre and north of the country. It is the sole station of the Diekirch branch, which divides from the main line at Ettelbruck.

External links 
 Official CFL page on Diekirch station
 Rail.lu page on Diekirch station

Railway station
Railway stations in Luxembourg
Railway stations on CFL Line 10